Marie Lindberg (born 14 August 1987) is a road cyclist from Sweden. She represented her nation at the 2006, 2009, 2010 and 2011 UCI Road World Championships.

References

External links
 profile at Procyclingstats.com

1987 births
Swedish female cyclists
Living people
Place of birth missing (living people)
20th-century Swedish women
21st-century Swedish women